Park Kyung-ho (born 9 March 1963) is a South Korean judoka.  He competed in the men's middleweight event at the 1984 Summer Olympics. He won a gold medal at the 1986 Asian Games in 86 kg.

His wife is Seo Hyang-soon, who won a gold medal in archery at the 1984 Summer Olympics. They have three children, their eldest daughter, Park Seong-min (박성민) is a professional golfer.

References

1963 births
Living people
South Korean male judoka
Olympic judoka of South Korea
Judoka at the 1984 Summer Olympics
Place of birth missing (living people)
Asian Games medalists in judo
Judoka at the 1986 Asian Games
Asian Games gold medalists for South Korea
Medalists at the 1986 Asian Games